The 2003 Sun Belt Conference football season was an NCAA football season that was played from August 28, 2003, to January 6, 2004.

References